Italian Mexicans are Mexican citizens of Italian descent or origin. The ancestors of most Mexicans of Italian descent arrived in the country during the late 19th century. Their descendants have generally assimilated into mainstream Mexican society.

History

During the colonial era there was a small number of non-Spanish European entrants, in particular Catholic missionaries. There are records of a few Italian soldiers and mariners in early New Spain. Prominent among the Italians was Juan Pablos (born Giovanni Paoli in Brescia), who founded the first printing shop in the Americas. The most important missionary was Eusebio Kino who led the evangelization of Pimería Alta.

Italian-Mexican identity rests on the common experience of migration from Italy in the late 19th century, a period characterized by a general Italian diaspora to the Americas. About 13,000 Italians emigrated to Mexico during this period, and at least half returned to Italy or went on to the United States. Most Italians who came to Mexico were farmers or farm workers from the northern Italian regions of Veneto, Trentino-Alto Adige/Südtirol, and Lombardy. Others, who arrived in the early 20th century, were from southern Italy. Many Italian settlers arriving in the late 19th and early 20th centuries received land grants from the Mexican government. When Benito Mussolini came to power, thousands of Italian families left Italy for Mexico.

The regions with the greatest populations of Mexican Italians are Mexico City, Monterrey, Puebla, Hidalgo  and Veracruz. Specifically in Hidalgo, there are a large number of people of Southern Italian descent.

Society

Although Italian-Mexicans claim an Italian ethnic identity, they generally note that they are Mexican as well. There were an estimated 850,000 Mexicans descended from Italian colonists. Population figures are uncertain because, unlike other countries, Mexico's census does not gather information on specific ethnic groups.
Most Italian Mexicans speak Spanish, but in Italian communities Italian and its related languages and dialects (usually mixed with Spanish) are used to communicate among themselves.

Italian community

Many Italian-Mexicans live in cities founded by their ancestors in the states of Veracruz (Huatusco) and San Luis Potosí. Smaller numbers of Italian-Mexicans live in Guanajuato and the State of Mexico, and the former haciendas (now cities) of Nueva Italia, Michoacán and Lombardia, Michoacán, both founded by Dante Cusi from Gambar in Brescia.

Playa del Carmen, Mahahual and Cancun in the state of Quintana Roo have also received a significant number of immigrants from Italy. Several families of Italian-Mexican descent were granted citizenship in the United States under the Bracero program to address a labor shortage of labor.

Italian companies have invested in Mexico, primarily in the tourism and hospitality industries. These ventures have sometimes resulted in settlements, but residents primarily live in the resort areas of the Riviera Maya, Baja California, Puerto Vallarta and Cancun. Although they generate employment, mainly in restaurants, hotels and entertainment centers, most employees have not become permanent residents of Mexico and live as ex-pats.

Italian culture in Mexico 

The Befana is a feast that comes from Veneto, a region in northern Italy. This is one of the best-known festivals in Mexico, even though there are other typical Italian traditions that have spread among the Chipileños such as bowling, some songs and various traditions practiced by children.

Eduardo Montagner Anguiano is a Mexican writer born in Chipilo, in the state of Puebla. He writes in Venetian and, precisely, in the Chipile variant. His literary works are part of Mexican literature of the 21st century and maintain the unique identity of the town of Chipilo. Eduardo Montagner Anguiano has a degree in Linguistics and has been a staunch defender of the minority languages ​​of Mexico (focusing, in particular, on the Chipileño variant).

As far as Mexican cuisine is concerned, there are many food contributions that have been brought by Italian immigrants. Caesar salad, for example, is part of Baja California gastronomy but originates in Italian cuisine. The salad's creation is generally attributed to the restaurateur Caesar Cardini, an Italian immigrant who operated restaurants in Mexico and the United States. Wines are also of significant importance in the cuisine of Baja California and, in Valle de Guadalupe, the Italian Mexican Cetto family promoted the wine industry together with other entrepreneurs.

The craft of the Mexican piñata has its origins in Spain and, in turn, Italy, due to the historical connection that arose in the old world between the two nations. In Mexico, the tradition of breaking piñatas was initially limited to the holiday season, but then spread to children's birthdays as well. Piñatas are part of a fusion of traditions from various regions of the world. In fact, the custom arose in China and reached Italy through Marco Polo, then it was spread by the Italian friars who brought it to New Spain, where it took root and acquired a Christian particularity with Aztec roots. Today it is part of the most common customs in Mexico.

Italian dialects

Most Italian immigration to Mexico occurred in the establishment of colonies. Dialects of Italian and languages of Italy which are still spoken include:
Lower Bellunese, a dialect of the Venetian language from the Province of Belluno in Colonia Diez Gutierrez in San Luis Potosí
Chipilo Venetian, a dialect of the Venetian language, as spoken in the province of Treviso, currently spoken in the city of Chipilo, Puebla  
Lombard in Sinaloa, Colonia Manuel González, Nueva Italia and Colonia Lombardia in the state of Michoacán
Trentino dialects of Lombard and Venetian in Colonia Manuel González, Veracruz and Tijuana, Baja California
Piedmontese in Gutierrez Zamora, Veracruz (the oldest Italian colony in Mexico) and La Estanzuela, Jalisco, another Italian colony
Sicilian, primarily in Mexico City, Reynosa and Monterrey

Notable Italian-Mexicans

 Marcelo Andreani, wrestler
 Rosángela Balbó, actress 
 Katie Barberi, actress
 Óscar Bonfiglio, footballer
 Eder Borelli, footballer
 Jared Borgetti, footballer
 Caesar Cardini, restaurateur, chef, and hotel owner
 Horacio Carochi, priest and grammarian
 Arturo Brizio Carter, football referee
 Cassiano Conzatti, botanist
 Aldo de Nigris, footballer
 Antonio de Nigris, footballer
 Alberto Del Rio, wrestler
 Adolfo Dollero, historian
 Walter Erviti, footballer
 Isidro Fabela, judge, politician, professor, writer, publisher, governor of the State of Mexico, diplomat, and delegate to the now defunct League of Nations.
 Vicente Filísola, military and politician
 Pedro Friedeberg, artist and designer
 Francesca Gargallo, writer
 Luis Ghilardi, general
 Filippa Giordano, singer
 Guillermo González Calderoni, commander of the Mexican Federal Judicial Police, and one of the strongmen of the Attorney General of Mexico
 Eusebio Kino, missionary
 Claudio Linati, artist
 Manuel María Lombardini, President of Mexico in 1853
 Teoberto Maler, explorer
 Tina Modotti, photographer
 Nicky Mondellini, actress
 Sasha Montenegro, actress
 Aldo Monti, actor
 Fabio Morábito, writer and poet
 Mario Pani, architect and urbanist
 Carlos Panini, businessman
 Giovanni Paoli, printer
 Pío Pico, politician, ranchero, and entrepreneur, famous for serving as the last governor of Alta California under Mexican rule
 Michael Ronda, actor and singer
 Alejandro Rossi, writer
 Martha Roth, actress
 Laurette Séjourné, archeologist
 Camila Sodi, singer, actress and model
 Luciano Spano, painter
 Fabrizio Tavano, footballer
 Thalía, singer and actress
 Gutierre Tibón, writer
 Rodolfo Neri Vela, scientist and astronaut
 Uberto Zanolli, composer

See also
 Immigration to Mexico
 Italy–Mexico relations

References

Further reading
Bohme, Frederick G. "The Italians in Mexico: A Minority's Contribution." Pacific Historical Review 28.1 (1959): 1-18
Gurwitz, Beatrice D. "Italian Immigrants and the Mexican Nation: The Cusi Family in Michoacán (1885–1938)." Immigrants & Minorities 33.2 (2015): 93-116.
Zilli Manica, José Benigno. La Villa Luisa de los Italianos: Un proyecto liberal. Xalapa: Universidad Veracruzana 1997.
Zilli Manica, José Benigno. Italianos en México: Documentos para la historia de los Colonos Italianos en México. Xalapa: Ediciones de San JoséĢ 1981.

External links
 Los que llegaron - Italianos from Canal Once (in Spanish)